Grimeton Radio Station in southern Sweden, close to Varberg in Halland, is an early longwave transatlantic wireless telegraphy station built in 1922–1924, that has been preserved as a historical site. From the 1920s through the 1940s it was used to transmit telegram traffic by Morse code to North America and other countries, and during World War II was Sweden's only telecommunication link with the rest of the world. It is the only remaining example of an early pre-electronic radio transmitter technology called an Alexanderson alternator. It was added to the UNESCO World Heritage List in 2004, with the statement: "Grimeton Radio Station, Varberg is an outstanding monument representing the process of development of communication technology in the period following the First World War." The radio station is also an anchor site for the European Route of Industrial Heritage. The transmitter is still in operational condition, and each year on a day called Alexanderson Day is started up and transmits brief Morse code test transmissions, which can be received all over Europe.

History
Beginning around 1910 industrial countries built networks of powerful transoceanic longwave radiotelegraphy stations to communicate telegraphically with other countries. During the First World War radio became a strategic technology when it was realized that a nation without long-distance radio capability could be isolated from the rest of the world by an enemy cutting its submarine telegraph cables. In 1921, Sweden's geographical dependence on other countries' underwater cable networks, and the temporary loss of those vital connections during the war, motivated a decision by the Swedish Parliament to build a radiotelegraphy station in Sweden to transmit telegram traffic across the Atlantic.

At the time, there were several different technologies used for high power radio transmission, each owned by a different giant industrial company. Bids were requested from Telefunken in Berlin, The Marconi Company in London, Radio Corporation of America (RCA) in New York and Société Française Radio-Electrique in Paris. The transmitter chosen was the Alexanderson alternator, invented around 1906 by Swedish-American Ernst Alexanderson and manufactured by RCA. This consisted of a huge rotating electromechanical AC generator (alternator) turned by an electric motor at a fast enough speed that it generated radio frequency alternating current, which was applied to the antenna. It was one of the first transmitters to generate sinusoidal continuous waves, which could communicate at longer range than the damped waves which were used by the earlier spark gap transmitters. After careful calculations, the station was located in Grimeton, on the southwest coast of Sweden, which allowed good radio wave propagation conditions over the North Atlantic to North America. To achieve daytime communication over such long distances, transoceanic stations took advantage of an earth-ionosphere waveguide mechanism which required them to transmit at frequencies in the very low frequency (VLF) range below 30 kHz. Radio transmitters required extremely large antennas to radiate these long waves efficiently. The Grimeton station had a huge multiply-tuned flattop antenna 1.9 km (1.2 miles) long consisting of twelve (later reduced to eight) wires supported on six 127 m (380 foot) high steel towers, fed at one end by vertical feeder wires extending up from the transmitter building.

The Alexanderson alternator technology was becoming obsolete even as it was installed. Vacuum tube electronic oscillator transmitters, which used the triode vacuum tube invented by Lee De Forest in 1907, replaced most pre-electronic transmitters in the early 1920s. However the large capital investment in an alternator transmitter caused owners to keep these huge behemoths in use long after they were technologically obsolete. By the mid-1930s transatlantic communication had switched to short waves, and vacuum tube shortwave transmitters were installed in the main building, using dipole and rhombic antennas in a neighbouring field. The Alexanderson alternator found a second use as a naval transmitter to communicate with submarines, as VLF frequencies can penetrate a short distance into seawater.

During the Second World War 1939–1945, the station experienced a heyday, when it was one of Scandinavia's gateways to the outside world. Underwater communication cable connections had once again been quickly severed by nations at war and the radiotelegraphy transmissions were a link to the outside world. The alternator continued to be used for naval transmissions until the mid-1990s, when a modern solid-state LF transmitter replaced it.

Grimeton Radio Station is now the only station left in the transatlantic network of nine long wave stations that were built during the years 1918–1924, all equipped with Alexanderson alternators. In 2004 it was added to the UNESCO World Heritage List. The Grimeton transmitter is the last surviving example of an Alexanderson alternator, the only radio station left from the pre-vacuum tube era, and is still in working condition. Each year, on a day called Alexanderson Day, either on the last Sunday in June, or on the first Sunday in July, whichever comes closer to 2 July, the site holds an open house during which the transmitter is started up and transmits test messages on 17.2 kHz using its call sign SAQ, which can be received all over Europe.

Working principle
The principle used is that of a generator (also called alternator) with an exact large number of poles driven to an exact speed matching the number of pole changes with the desired output frequency (f = poles/2 * revolutions). The switching on and off of the transmitter with the signalling morse key makes the driver motor change frequency just a bit, so the frequency is outside the narrow band of the antenna and thus transmitted with much less power. In fact this forms an early and clever form of frequency shift keying (FSK). In the days of construction this was the only way known to output very high power at radio frequencies. 
Like turning the dynamo of a bike: a dynamo has for instance four poles and by turning this at 100 revolutions (turns) per second the output will be 200 Hertz. If the number of poles in the dynamo is increased to 80 the same driving speed will produce a 4 kHz signal. Increasing both the number of poles and the turning speed makes higher frequencies possible.

Schematic diagram of principle

Between points "a" and "b" there will be a signal with frequency 15 times (because of 30 poles) the number of revolutions. The turning rod with electrical windings creating a coil will undergo a sequence of north and south magnetic poles. This induces an alternating current that presents itself on the points 'a' and 'b'. This presented model has fixed (stator) magnets and a rotating (rotor) coil. The places of the two can be exchanged so the magnets are turning in the centre and the coils are in a ring around it. This makes transfer of the coil signal to the next stages (tuning network and antenna) easier.

Antenna system 
The antenna system, consisting of antenna wires supported by towers like those supporting high-tension power lines, has a very low efficiency due to the fact that the length of the antenna is still relatively small compared to the output wavelength.

The multiple-tuned antenna used at Grimeton is a pre-WW1 invention by E F W Alexanderson, which uses a number of vertical radiator wires interconnected by the flat-top wires, which serve both as top capacitance and as a high-voltage transmission line.

Each vertical wire is terminated in a ground-mounted tuning inductance (or "coil") which serves to tune out the capacitive reactance of the wire, and to establish the proper phase relationship between the currents in the wires.

By dividing the total current flowing into the ground or counterpoise system between several connection points, the equivalent ground loss resistance may be substantially reduced compared to the case when all current is fed into a single vertical radiator.

This increases the antenna efficiency with about an order of magnitude.

Technical details
To achieve maximum range, like other transoceanic radiotelegraphy stations of this era it transmitted in the VLF band, at a frequency of 17.2 kilohertz and so the wavelength is approximately 17,442 meters. Even though the antenna is approximately 2 km long, it is short compared with the wavelength and so it is not very efficient. The six antenna masts each have a 46m cross-arm at the top and are 127m high. Today they carry 8 antenna conductors although originally there were 12.

There are 64 windings on the stator of the alternator/generator, and each provides 100 V at up to 30 A, i.e. approximately 3 kW. Thus the peak RF output power is approximately 64 x 3 kW or 200 kW, although these days it is usually limited to about 80 kW. The rotor is a steel disc measuring 1.6 m in diameter and approximately 7.5 cm thick at the periphery. Around its circumference it has 488 brass filled slots. The air gap between the stator and rotor is 1 mm or less. The motor to drive the generator is capable of delivering 500 HP (approximately 370 kW). It is supplied by a 2,200V supply from a transformer-derived 2 phase supply, and turns at 711.3 rpm to obtain the specified frequency of operation. The complete transmitter set weighs about 50 tons. Further details can be found here.

Gallery

See also

List of masts
List of towers

References

External links
 Official website
 World Heritage profile
 Explore Grimeton Radio Station in the UNESCO collection on Google Arts and Culture
 Alexander - Grimeton Veteran Radio's Friends
 
 
 Receive SAQ with soundcard only 
 Grimeton VLF transmitter tower 1, SkyscraperPage
 Grimeton VLF transmitter tower 2, SkyscraperPage
 Grimeton VLF transmitter tower 3, SkyscraperPage
 Grimeton VLF transmitter tower 4, SkyscraperPage
 Grimeton VLF transmitter tower 5, SkyscraperPage
 Grimeton VLF transmitter tower 6, SkyscraperPage
 Grimeton TV mast, ScyscraperPage
 Alexanderson Society official webpage 
 Transmission with christmas greetings

Listed buildings in Sweden
Varberg Municipality
Towers in Sweden
Radio masts and towers in Europe
World Heritage Sites in Sweden
Transmitter sites in Sweden
Buildings and structures in Halland County
Infrastructure completed in 1924
1924 establishments in Sweden